Archimède was one of four experimental submarines ordered for the French Navy in 1906. Each boat was built to a different design and Archimède was optimized to maximize speed and range.

Background and description
The Board of Construction intended to order 20 submarines for the 1906 naval program, including two large long-range experimental boats. The board was preempted by Navy Minister Gaston Thomson who opened a competition for submarines that were faster on the surface and with longer range than the preceding  on 6 February 1906. Four designs were submitted, including one by naval constructor Julien Eugène Hutter using an  Pluviôse-type hull enlarged and optimized to meet the speed and range requirements, all of which were authorized by the board, along with 16 s.

Archimède displaced  surfaced and  submerged, almost half again more than the Pluviôse-class boats. Like most French submarines of this period, Archimède was fitted with a prominent "walking deck" above her single hull to facilitate operations on the surface.

The submarine's hull was divided into nine watertight compartments. The boat had two rudders at her stern, one below the waterline and the other above. She had three sets of diving planes, fore, aft, and amidships, to control her depth below the water. The hull was fitted with 20 external ballast tanks and 4 internal tanks, 3 of which could be used as auxiliary tanks for fuel oil.

Submerged, each propeller was driven by a Breguet  electric motor using electricity from four 62-cell batteries.

Internally, Archimède was armed with a single  torpedo tube in the bow. Externally, the boat was equipped with two single rotating Drzewiecki drop collars below the "walking deck" aft of the conning tower, two fixed launching frames abreast the conning tower, aimed 10° off the centerline, and another pair forward of conning tower aimed 6° outwards. The submarine was equipped with Modèle 1906 torpedoes.

Construction, trials and subsequent history
Archimède was ordered on 31 December 1906 as part of the 1906 competition from the Cherbourg Naval Base. She was laid down on 2 January 1908 and was launched on 4 August 1909. While exiting the harbor on 24 December, the boat accidentally struck the  a glancing blow while turning. Neither ship was damaged. Engineering problems delayed Archimèdes commissioning until September 1911 when she was assigned to the Cherbourg defensive group of submarines. Early the following year, the boat was transferred to the 1st Submarine Flotilla of the Light Squadron when those units were formed. On 10 June 1912, the submarine was transferred to the Third Squadron at Brest for offensive missions.

When the First World War began in August 1914, Archimède was assigned to the 3rd Submarine Flotilla of the 2nd Light Squadron at Cherbourg which had the mission of closing the English Channel to German ships and protecting Entente ships in cooperation with the Royal Navy. Archimède and the submarine  were ordered to Calais on 24 September and placed under British command in preparation for operations in the North Sea. Archimède was transferred to the 2nd Submarine Flotilla on 19 October. At the end of the following month the boat was sent to Harwich, England, and placed under the command of Commodore Roger Keyes. After the British discovered that the German High Seas Fleet had sortied into the North Sea late on 14 December, Keyes ordered eight of his submarines, including Archimède, to set up a patrol line north of the neutral Dutch island of Terschelling no later than the morning of 16 December to defend against any German attempt to enter the English Channel. Archimède was paired with the British submarine  and they were stationed at the northern end of the patrol line. If no German ships were spotted, Archimède was to station itself between Heligoland island and the lightship at the mouth of the Weser River and remain on station until the night of the 18th.

See also 
List of submarines of France

Citations

Bibliography

 

 

World War I submarines of France
1909 ships
Submarine classes